A gambit (from Italian , the act of tripping someone with the leg to make them fall) is a chess opening in which a player sacrifices  with the aim of achieving a subsequent  advantage.

The word gambit is also sometimes used to describe similar tactics used by politicians or business people in a struggle with rivals in their respective fields, for example: "The early election was a risky gambit by Theresa May."

Terminology 
The word "gambit" was originally applied to chess openings in 1561 by Spanish priest Ruy López de Segura, from an Italian expression dare il gambetto (to put a leg forward in order to trip someone). López studied this maneuver, and so the Italian word gained the Spanish form gambito that led to French gambit, which has influenced the English spelling of the word. The broader sense of "opening move meant to gain advantage" was first recorded in English in 1855.

Gambits are most commonly played by White. Some well-known examples of a gambit are the King's Gambit (1.e4 e5 2.f4) and Evans Gambit (1.e4 e5 2.Nf3 Nc6 3.Bc4 Bc5 4.b4). A gambit employed by Black may also be named a gambit, e.g. the Latvian Gambit (1.e4 e5 2.Nf3 f5), or Englund Gambit (1.d4 e5); but is sometimes named a "countergambit", e.g. the Albin Countergambit (1.d4 d5 2.c4 e5) and Greco Countergambit (the original name for the Latvian Gambit). Not all opening lines involving the sacrifice of material are named as gambits, for example the main line of the Two Knights Defense (1.e4 e5 2.Nf3 Nc6 3.Bc4 Nf6 4.Ng5 d5 5.exd5 Na5) in which Black sacrifices a pawn for active play is known as the "Knorre Variation", though it may be described as a "gambit". On the other hand, the Queen's Gambit (1.d4 d5 2.c4) is not a true gambit as Black cannot hold the pawn without incurring a disadvantage. As is often the case with chess openings, nomenclature is inconsistent.

Strategy 

Gambits are described as being "offered" to an opponent, and that offer is then said to be either "accepted" or "declined".

In modern chess, the typical response to a moderately sound gambit is to accept the material and give the material back at an advantageous time. For gambits that are less sound, the accepting player is more likely to try to hold on to their extra material. Often, a gambit can be declined with no disadvantage.

Soundness 
A gambit is said to be 'sound' if it is capable of procuring adequate concessions from the opponent. There are three general criteria in which a gambit is often said to be sound:
 Time gain: the player accepting the gambit must take time to procure the sacrificed material and possibly must use more time to reorganize their pieces after the material is taken.
 Generation of differential activity: often a player accepting a gambit will decentralize their pieces or pawns and their poorly placed pieces will allow the gambiteer to place their own pieces and pawns on squares that might otherwise have been inaccessible. Former world champion Mikhail Tal once reportedly told Mikhail Botvinnik that he had sacrificed a pawn because it was simply in the way.
 Generation of positional weaknesses: finally, accepting a gambit may lead to a compromised pawn structure, holes or other positional deficiencies.

An example of a sound gambit is the Scotch Gambit: 1.e4 e5 2.Nf3 Nc6 3.d4 exd4 4.Bc4. Here Black can force White to sacrifice a pawn speculatively with 4...Bb4+, but White gets very good compensation for one pawn after 5.c3 dxc3 6.bxc3, or for two pawns after 6.0-0 inviting 6...cxb2 7.Bxb2, due to the development advantage and attacking chances against the black king. As a result, Black is often advised not to try to hold on to the extra pawn. A more dubious gambit is the so-called Halloween Gambit: 1.e4 e5 2.Nf3 Nc6 3.Nc3 Nf6 4.Nxe5 Nxe5 5.d4. Here the investment (a knight for just one pawn) is too large for the moderate advantage of having a strong center.

Examples 

King's Gambit: 1.e4 e5 2.f4
Queen's Gambit:  1.d4 d5 2.c4
Evans Gambit: 1.e4 e5 2.Nf3 Nc6 3.Bc4 Bc5 4.b4
Rousseau Gambit: 1.e4 e5 2.Nf3 Nc6 3.Bc4 f5
Smith–Morra Gambit: 1.e4 c5 2.d4 intending 2...cxd4 3.c3 dxc3 4.Nxc3
Two Knights Defense:  1.e4 e5 2.Nf3 Nc6 3.Bc4 Nf6 4.Ng5 d5 with 5.exd5 Na5 6.Bb5+ c6 7.dxc6 bxc6 likely to follow
Blackmar–Diemer Gambit (BDG):  1.d4 d5 2.e4 dxe4 3.Nc3 followed by 4.f3
From's Gambit: 1.f4 e5
Staunton Gambit: 1.d4 f5 2.e4
Budapest Gambit:  1.d4 Nf6 2.c4 e5
Scotch Gambit: 1.e4 e5 2.Nf3 Nc6 3.d4 exd4 4.Bc4
Latvian Gambit: 1.e4 e5 2.Nf3 f5
Danish Gambit:  1.e4 e5 2.d4 exd4 3. c3
Blackburne Shilling Gambit: 1.e4 e5 2.Nf3 Nc6 3.Bc4 Nd4
This is not a true gambit by Black, since after 4.Nxe5 Qg5 Black wins material. White can play a gambit themselves with 5.Bxf7+! Ke7 6.0-0! Qxe5 7.Bxg8 Rxg8 8.c3 Nc6 9.d4, when White's two pawns and rolling pawn center, combined with Black's misplaced king, give White strong compensation for the sacrificed bishop.
Elephant Gambit: 1.e4 e5 2.Nf3 d5!?
Englund Gambit: 1.d4 e5?!
Italian Gambit: 1.e4 e5 2.Nf3 Nc6 3.Bc4 Bc5 4.d4
Fried Liver Attack: 1.e4 e5 2.Nf3 Nc6 3.Bc4 Nf6 4.Ng5 d5 5.exd5 Nxd5 6.Nxf7 Kxf7
Albin Countergambit: 1.d4 d5 2.c4 e5
Benko Gambit:  1.d4 Nf6 2.c4 c5 3.d5 b5
Milner Barry Gambit: 1.e4 e6 2.d4 d5 3.e5 c5 4.c3 Nc6 5.Nf3 Qb6 6.Bd3 cxd4 7.cxd4 Bd7 8.Nc3 Nxd4 9.Nxd4 Qxd4
Vienna Gambit: 1.e4 e5 2.Nc3 Nf6 3.f4

Notes

Further reading

External links

 Guide to Chess Gambits (Part 1)
 Guide to Chess Gambits (Part 2)
 Emil Diemer (1908–1990) et les gambits sur le site Mieux jouer aux échecs
 Le gambit letton sur le site Mieux jouer aux échecs
 Le gambit Humphrey Bogart sur le site Mieux jouer aux échecs
 Le gambit Fajarowicz sur le site Mieux jouer aux échecs
 Le gambit Boden sur le site Mieux jouer aux échecs
 David Gedult (1897-1981) et les gambits sur le site Mieux jouer aux échecs
 Scacchi: Enciclopedia pratica dei Gambetti 

Gambit
Chess terminology